Omiodes antidoxa is a moth of the family Crambidae. It is endemic to the Hawaiian islands of Kauai and Oahu.

The larvae feed on Carex oahuensis and Rhynchospora thyrsoidea. Full-grown larvae are bright green.

The pupa is about 12 mm long and brown with a greenish tinge especially in the thoracic region. The cocoon is slight and made in the retreat where the caterpillar lived. Pupation takes place two to four days after the cocoon is started. The larval period lasts 20–22 days. The pupal period 10–11 days.

External links

Moths described in 1904
antidoxa
Endemic moths of Hawaii